The 2015–2016 session was a session of the California State Legislature. The session first convened on December 1, 2014, and adjourned sine die on November 30, 2016.

Major events

Vacancies and special elections 
 September 22, 2014: Democratic senator Rod Wright (35th–Inglewood) resigns to serve a jail sentence after conviction for perjury and voter fraud.
 December 10, 2014: Former Democratic assemblyman Isadore Hall, III of Compton is sworn into office after winning the December 9 special election for the 35th State Senate district to replace Wright.
 January 2, 2015: Democratic senator Mark DeSaulnier (7th–Concord) resigns to take a seat in Congress.
 January 3, 2015: Republican senator Mimi Walters (37th–Irvine) resigns to take a seat in Congress.
 January 5, 2015: Republican senator Steve Knight (21st–Palmdale) resigns to take a seat in Congress.
 March 19, 2015: Former Republican senator Sharon Runner of Lancaster is sworn into office after winning the March 17 special election for the 21st State Senate district to replace Knight.
 March 22, 2015: Former Republican county supervisor John Moorlach of Costa Mesa is sworn into office after winning the March 17 special election for the 37th State Senate district to replace Walters.
 May 28, 2015: Former Orinda mayor Steve Glazer is sworn into office after winning the May 19 special election for the 7th State Senate district to replace DeSaulnier.
 December 31, 2015: Democratic assemblymember Henry Perea resigns to become senior director of state advocacy for the Pharmaceutical Research and Manufacturers of America.
 July 14, 2016: Republican senator Sharon Runner (21st–Lancaster) dies of respiratory complications related to scleroderma

Leadership changes 
 August 27, 2015: Republican senator Jean Fuller (16th–Bakersfield) replaces senator Bob Huff (29th–San Dimas) as Senate minority leader, as Huff is termed out at the end of the session.
 January 4, 2016: Republican assemblymember Chad Mayes (42nd–Yucca Valley) replaces assemblymember Kristin Olsen (12th–Modesto) as Assembly minority leader, as Olsen is termed out at the end of the session.
 March 7, 2016: Democratic assemblymember Anthony Rendon (63rd–Lakewood) replaces assemblymember Toni Atkins (78th–San Diego) as speaker, as Atkins is termed out at the end of the session.

Party changes

Senate

Officers 

The Secretary, the Sergeant-at-Arms, and the Chaplain are not members of the Legislature.

Members

Assembly

Officers 

The Chief Clerk, the Sergeant-at-Arms, and the Chaplain are not members of the Legislature.

Members

See also
 List of California state legislatures

References

External links 
 California State Senate
 California State Assembly

2015-2016
2015 in California
2016 in California
California
California